Ponciano Castro (born 28 January 1953) is a Colombian former footballer. He played in nine matches for the Colombia national football team in 1975. He was also part of Colombia's squad for the 1975 Copa América tournament.

References

External links
 

1953 births
Living people
Colombian footballers
Colombia international footballers
Place of birth missing (living people)
Association football midfielders
Independiente Medellín footballers
Millonarios F.C. players
Deportivo Pereira footballers
Cúcuta Deportivo footballers